Coriocella is a genus of small slug-like sea snails, marine gastropod molluscs in the family Velutinidae.

Description
The ear-shaped shell is extremely thin, even membranous in part and concealed in the mantle. It has a small spiral turn at the apex. The aperture is very large. The shell lacks a columella.

The soft body is elliptical and much depressed. The borders of the mantle are very thin, notched in front and spreading out widely. The oval foot is very small. The head is scarcely distinct. The two short and rather thick tentacles are contractile and concealed under the shield. The eyes are situated at the base of the tentacles.

Species
Species within the genus Coriocella include:
Coriocella fella Er. Marcus & Ev. Marcus, 1970
 Coriocella herberti Drivas & Jay, 1990
Coriocella hibyae Wellens, 1991
Coriocella jayi Wellens, 1995
Coriocella nigra Blainville, 1824 - type species of the genus Coriocella
Coriocella safagae Wellens, 1999
Coriocella tongana (Quoy & Gaimard, 1832)

References

External links
 Blainville, H. M. D. de. (1824). Mollusques, Mollusca. In: Dictionnaire des Sciences Naturelles (F. Cuvier, ed.), vol. 32. Levrault, Strasbourg et Paris, & Le Normant, Paris. 1-392

Velutinidae